The Bangladesh Police of the People's Republic of Bangladesh is a law enforcement agency, operating under the Ministry of Home Affairs. It plays a crucial role in maintaining peace, and enforcement of law and order within Bangladesh. Though the police are primarily concerned with the maintenance of law and order and security of persons and property of individuals, they also play a big role in the criminal justice system. Bangladesh police played an important role during the Bangladesh Liberation War.

History

Medieval period 
Details of policing activities during the middle age are challenging to find. However, during the periods of the great sultans, an official holding the position of Muhtasib used to perform the duties of policing. This person was the chief of police, in charge of public works, and the inspector of public ethics simultaneously. In urban areas, Kotwals were responsible for performing police duties. The policing system introduced by Sher Shah Suri was further organised during the period of Emperor Akbar: the Emperor organised his administrative structure introducing Fouzdari (the principal representative of the Emperor), Mir Adal and Kazi (the head of judicial department), and Kotwal (the chief police official of larger cities). This system was effective in maintaining the law and order in cities, and was implemented in Dhaka. Many district sadar police stations are still called Kotwali police stations. In the Mughal period, Kotwal emerged as an institution.

A Fouzdar was appointed to every administrative unit of the government (district), under whom there were some artillery and cavalry forces. There was a disciplined police system during the Mughal period, though there was no professional police force like that in the British period.

British period [1857 - 1947] 
In the early stage of the Industrial Revolution, when England was facing grave crisis due to socio-economic transformation, the necessity of an effective organised police service was keenly felt. Sir Robert Peel, then the Prime Minister, introduced a bill in the British Parliament in 1829 which created an organised civil police in London. The success of the London police in controlling social disorder and crime was admired by not only the people of England but also of European and American countries: New York city copied the London model with some modifications when it organised the first Municipal Police Force, in 1833.

In 1858, full control of the Indian Territory was taken over from the East India Company by the British government. The success of the London police organised under Peel's Act of 1829 prompted the British government to reform the police system in the sub-continent in a similar way to British constabularies. With this end in view, a police commissioner was set up 1840, and on the recommendation of the commission of the Police Act (Act V of 1861), was passed by the British Parliament. Under this Act a police force was created in each province of British India, and placed under the control of the provincial government. The administration of the police force of a province was vested upon an officer styled as the Inspector-general of police. The administration of the police in a district was placed under the Superintendent of Police. The Act is still in force throughout the sub-continent, and regulates the function of police in Bangladesh, as well as the other countries of the sub-continent.

Pakistan period [1947 - 1970] 
After partition of the sub-continent in 1947, the police force in Bangladesh was first named as the East Bengal Police, and then as the East Pakistan Police; however, it continued to function on the same lines as during the British rule.

Role in Liberation War [1971] 
In the Bangladesh Liberation War, Bengali-speaking police officers participated with the citizens, leading to deaths from most ranks, fighting with .303 rifles against the Pakistani. The resistance by the Bengali members of police at Rajarbagh is considered the first chapter of armed struggles during the Bangladesh Liberation war. Bangladesh Police founded a Liberation War Museum at the Rajarbagh police line in January 2017.

Bangladesh period [1971 - present] 
After the emergence of Bangladesh as an independent country on 16 December 1971, the police force was recognised and assumed the role of a national police force. In January 2004, the Bangladesh Nationalist Party led government removed the boat from the police force badge because the boat is also the symbol of  the then opposition party, Bangladesh Awami League. The police had been using the boat in its symbol since the independence of Bangladesh.

Organisation 
Bangladesh Police is headed by the Inspector General of Police (IGP), under whose command, Bangladesh Police is divided into several units.

Units 
Subnational units
 Range Police
 Metropolitan Police

Specialized units
 Traffic Police
 Airport Armed Police (AAP)
 Diplomatic Security Division
 Tourist Police (Website)
 Highway Police
 Industrial Police (IP)
 River Police
 Railway Police (GRP) (Website)
Police Air Wing
 Mountain Police 
Mass Rapid Transit (MRT) Police Force

Specialized Battalions
 Special Security and Protection Battalion (SPBn)
 Special Armed Force (SAF)
 Range Police and Range Reserve Force (RRF)
 Rapid Action Battalion (RAB)
 Armed Police Battalion (APBn)

Specialized Team
 Special Weapons And Tactics (SWAT)
 Crisis Response Team (CRT)
 Anti-Terrorism Unit (ATU)
 Bomb Disposal Unit
 Canine Unit

Institutes 
 Police Headquarters (PHQ)
 Police Staff College, Bangladesh (PSC)
 Bangladesh Police Academy, Sarda (BPA)
 Police Training Centers (PTCs)
 Specialized Training Center like DTS/TDS/FTC/SBTS/IPTC/ITTS/Telecom TS/MDTS/PSTS etc.

Intelligences 
 Special Branch (SB)
 Detective Branch (DB)
 Counter Terrorism and Transnational Crime (CT)
 Police Internal Oversight (PIO)
 Cyber Security and Crime Division
 Telecommunication and Information Management (T&IM)

Investigation Unit 
 Criminal Investigation Department (CID)
 Police Bureau of Investigation (PBI)

Ranks

Superior officers

Subordinate officers

Medals 
Police medals are awarded every year in the annual Police Week Parade. They are awarded both for bravery and service.

Bangladesh Police Medal (BPM)

  Bangladesh Police Medal (Bravery)

  Bangladesh Police Medal (Service)

  President Police Medal (Bravey)
  President Police Medal (Service)

Selection and training 
The recruitment process differs according to the level of position being recruited to, and direct entry (where an applicant does not have to start at the lowest level) is possible. The educational requirements increase with rank. A minimum bachelor's degree is required for Assistant Superintendent of Police, Sub-Inspector, and Sergeant, and for Constable, a Secondary School Certificate is required. Recruitment is conducted in the following three tiers:
 In the rank of Assistant Superintendent of Police (ASP)
 In the rank of Sub-Inspector (SI) or Sergeant
 In the rank of Constable

Assistant Superintendent of Police (ASP) 
The Assistant Superintendent of Police (ASP) are recruited by the Bangladesh Public Service Commission (BPSC) through the competitive Bangladesh Civil Service  the Bangladesh Police Academy as Probationary ASPs. After passing from the academy, they undergo an orientation training for six months in the district level as a probationer. After that they have been appointed as a full-fledged ASPs in different units.

Sub-Inspector (SI) 
Sub-Inspectors are recruited by Police Headquarters centrally. They undergo a one-year-long training in the Bangladesh Police Academy as Outside Cadet Sub-Inspectors. After that they have partake in two years probationary period in different police units. After that they have been appointed as a full-fledged SIs in different units.

Sergeant 
Sergeants are recruited by Police Headquarters centrally. After appointment they undergo a one-year-long training course in the Bangladesh Police Academy, at the rank of Probationary Sergeant. After passing from the academy, they also undergo an orientation training of one year in the rank of probationer.

Constable 
Constables are recruited in the district level. They undergo a six-month-long training in the Police Training Centre as a Trainee Recruit Constable career (TRC).

Training institutions 
The main training institution of the Bangladesh Police is the Bangladesh Police Academy, established in 1912 in Sardah. The Police Staff College, which trains officers from ASP to DIG in-service, was established in 2000 in Dhaka. Bangladesh Police also maintains Police Training Centre (PTC) in Tangail, Rangpur, Khulna and Noakhali. The Detective Training School was established in 1962 in Dhaka.

List of training institutions 
 Police Staff College, Dhaka
 Bangladesh Police Academy, Sardah, Rajshahi
 Police Training Centre, Tangail
 Police Training Centre, Rangpur
 Police Training Centre, Khulna
 Police Training Centre, Noakhali
 Detective Training School (DTS), Rajarbagh, Dhaka
 Forensic Training Institute, Malibagh, Dhaka
 Special Branch Training School, Malibagh, Dhaka
 Police Peacekeepers' Training School, Rajarbagh, Dhaka
 Police Special Training School (PSTS), Betbunia, Rangamati
 Traffic and Driving School (TDS), Mill Barrack, Dhaka
 Motor Driver Training School (MDTS), Jamalpur
 Telecommunications Training School, T&IM, Rajarbagh, Dhaka
 Armed Police Battalion and specialised training centre, Khagrachari
 Rapid Action Battalion Forces Training School, Gazipur
 Armed Police Battalion Training School
Moreover, there are in-service training centres in different districts.

Community policing 
In Bangladesh police, community policing is an organisation with the aims of promoting community, government and police partnerships, proactive problem solving, and community engagement to address the causes of crime, fear of crime and community issues. Bangladesh Police have been trying to implement this philosophy nationwide. The Police Reform Program (PRP), a UNDP funded project, has been providing Bangladesh Police with technical assistance to implement community-policing nationwide.

Strategic partnership 
Under the strategic partnership there are:
 a National Community Policing Advisory Committee, chaired by the Secretary of the Ministry of Home Affairs
 a National Community Policing Co-ordination Committee headed by the IGP or an additional Inspector General of Police at the Police Headquarters
 a Crime Prevention Centre, set up in the police Headquarters having the Detective Inspector General (Crime) at the focal point

Implementation partnership 
The implementation partnership starts at the district level:
There is a district community-policing cell in every district under the Superintendent of Police. The Additional SP or an ASP looks after the district community-policing cell.
Secondly,  in the police station level, there is a community policing cell with a full-time community policing officer (CPO), who coordinates the community policing activities in the police station jurisdiction.

Beat policing 
Dhaka Metropolitan Police is implementing the beat policing in Dhaka city. In this regard, each Police Station is divided into some police beats, and for each beat there is an assigned Beat Policing Officer.

Women in Bangladesh Police 
Women first joined Bangladesh Police in 1974, when 14 women police officers were appointed in the Special Branch: seven were at the rank of Sub-Inspector, and seven were at the rank of Constable. The first female uniformed police members were recruited two years later, in 1976, when 15 women police officers were appointed in the Dhaka Metropolitan Police. They were also at the ranks of Constable and Sub-Inspector.

In 1986, there was only one serving woman police officer: Fatema Begum was appointed as Assistant Superintendent of Police through 6th Bangladesh Civil Service (BCS) examination. After two years, in 1988, four women joined Bangladesh Police through the 7th Bangladesh Civil Service examination. After an interval from 1989 to 1998, in 1999, eight women officers were appointed through the 18th Bangladesh Civil Service examination. On 21 June 2011 an all-women Armed Police Battalion (APBn-11) was created as the 11th battalion of this force.

As of 2010, there are 2,240 women in the Bangladesh Police, from the rank of constable to additional police superintendent.

UN peace-keeping operations 
Since its first mission in Namibia in 1989, the Bangladesh Police has contributed to numerous UN peace-keeping missions.

List of completed and present UNPOL and FPU Peacekeeping missions participated by Bangladesh Police:

Corruption and controversies 

Bangladesh Police has been criticized for having political influence in all levels, and the major decisions are taken under political conditions. Corruption is widespread among the law enforcement, with custody deaths and torture being prevalent.

In 2016 January, Dhaka South City Corporation official was tortured by Dhaka Metropolitan Police members. In the same month a sub-inspector at DMP was accused of torturing and attempting to extort money from a Bangladesh Bank official. Bangladesh Police have been accused of being involved in crime including rape and murder. Bangladesh opposition party has accused the police of being used to suppress the opposition parities. The accountability of the police has been question by the media. 230 Police officers in Barisal Metropolitan Police created a collective bribe fund for promotions. Bangladesh Police had faced criticism after telling secular bloggers to self-censure after the Attacks on secularists in Bangladesh. Wife of Avijit Roy had accused Bangladesh Police of Inactivity during the attack on her husband. British Government has faced criticism for its aid to Bangladesh Police which could be used to suppress dissidents.

Mohammad Harun-Ur-Rashid, Superintendent of Police, is the head of Dhaka Metropolitan Police (DMP) Tejgaon division. He has faced a number of controversies. On 3 November 2019, he kidnapped the wife and minor son of Showkat Aziz Russell, Chairperson of Amber group, for the purpose of extortion from Gulshan and shifted them to Narayanganj. He was removed from his post in Narayanganj after the incident came to light. He continued working at the post four days after his transfer came through. The Business Standard, a Bangladeshi newspaper, described him as a "case of police impunity". He made the news first on 6 July 2011 for assaulting Zainul Abdin Farroque, Bangladesh Nationalist Party politician, opposition whip, and member of parliament. He was awarded and promoted for the assault on Zainul. In November 2019, a video of him went viral, where he and other police officers were seen attacking a referee in a friendly football match.

Notes

References

Further reading 
 

 
Law enforcement agencies of Bangladesh
Recipients of the Ekushey Padak
Recipients of the Independence Day Award